The International Socialist Movement was a Trotskyist current inside the Scottish Socialist Party (SSP) from 2001 until March 2006.  It came into existence as a change of name by Scottish Militant Labour, the since defunct Scottish section of the Committee for a Workers' International.  In January 2002 it disaffiliated from the CWI after increasing clashes the CWI's leadership around Peter Taffe, although a significant minority based mainly in Dundee stayed with the CWI and formed a pro-CWI platform in the SSP called the International Socialists.

For a few years the ISM was effectively the leadership of the SSP.  It developed strong relationships with other currents in the socialist movement, including as a permanent observer with the United Secretariat of the Fourth International. Members of the International Socialist Group in Scotland joined the ISM.

The ISM dissolved in March 2006 stating that it had completed its mission.  The reasons for doing so were rather complex.  In practice it was having difficulty operating as a coherent political organisation.  It had been badly divided internally in the context of a rather heated debate in the SSP around 50-50 representation for women in the run up to the 2003 Scottish election.  These divisions became exacerbated by the resignation of Tommy Sheridan as convenor and the election of the new convenor, which was a contest between two ISM members, Colin Fox and Alan McCombes.  Some leading members of the SSP, particularly women, had left the ISM or never joined, while others remained nominally members but were not taking part in meetings (e.g. only one member of the SSP executive, Joanna Harvie, attended the ISM meeting which decided to dissolve) and it had become an organisation of SSP middle cadre e.g. branch organisers.  However its journal, Frontline, continues publication as an "Independent Marxist voice in the SSP".

External links 
Statement on the future of the ISM
Frontline, former ISM journal, now independent

Factions of the Scottish Socialist Party
Defunct Trotskyist organisations in the United Kingdom
2001 establishments in Scotland
2006 disestablishments in Scotland